Standing Room Only may refer to:

Standing-room only, an event where all of the seats are occupied, forcing later attendees to stand

Film
Standing Room Only (1912 film), an American silent short romantic comedy
Standing Room Only (1944 film), an American film starring Paulette Goddard and Fred MacMurray  	
Standing Room Only (2003 film), directed by Deborra-Lee Furness
Standing Room Only (1991 TV programme), a 1991 BBC television programme on association football
Standing Room Only (TV series), a 1976 entertainment series on HBO

Literature
 Standing Room Only (novel), a 1936 comedy novel by Walter Greenwood

Music
Standing Room Only (Tesla album)
Standing Room Only (The Motels album), 2006
"Standing Room Only" (song), a 1976 top-ten country single by Barbara Mandrell
 "Standing Room Only", a 1967 gospel song by Loretta Lynn from Who Says God Is Dead!
Sinatra: Standing Room Only, a 2018 live box set by Frank Sinatra

See also
SRO (disambiguation)